Osina Mała may refer to the following places in Poland:
Osina Mała, Lower Silesian Voivodeship (south-west Poland)
Osina Mała, Łódź Voivodeship (central Poland)